1-Pentyne, an organic compound with the formula . It is a terminal alkyne, in fact the smallest that is liquid a room temperature.  It is a colorless liquid.

See also
 2-Pentyne, an isomer

References

External links
 NIST Chemistry WebBook page for 1-pentyne

Alkynes